The 145th New York Infantry Regimentt, the "Stanton Legion", was an infantry regiment of the Union Army during the American Civil War.

Service 
It was organized at Staten Island, and there mustered in the service of the United States for three years September 11, 1862. The companies were recruited principally:
 A, B, C, D, E, F, H and I at New York City;
 G at Patchogue, Staten Island and New York City, and
 K at Hempstead, Oyster Bay, Staten Island and New York City.

The regiment left the State September 27, 1862; it served in the 2d Brigade, 2d Division, 12th Corps, Army of the Potomac, from September 30, 1862; in the 2d Brigade, 1st Division, 12th Corps, from April, 1863; in the 1st Brigade, 1st Division, 12th Corps, from May, 1863; and, December 9, 1863, the enlisted men were transferred to the 107th, 123rd and 150th Infantry, and the regiment discontinued.

Total strength and casualties 
During its service the regiment lost by death, killed in action, 1 officer, 6 enlisted men; of wounds received in action, 8 enlisted men; of disease and other causes, 35 enlisted men; total, 1 officer, 49 enlisted men; aggregate, 50; of whom 1 enlisted man died in the hands of the enemy.

Commanders 
Colonel William H. Allen
Colonel Edward Livingston Price
Lieutenant Colonel Ole Peter Hansen Balling
Lieutenant Colonel Roswell L. Van Wagenen
Major R. L. Van Wagenen
Major George W. Reid

See also 

List of New York Civil War regiments

Notes

References 
The Civil War Archive

External links 
New York State Military Museum Unit History Project New York State Military Museum and Veterans Research Center - Civil War - 145th Infantry Regiment History, photographs, table of battles and casualties, and historical sketch for the 145th New York Infantry Regiment.

Infantry 145
1862 establishments in New York (state)
Military units and formations established in 1862
Military units and formations disestablished in 1863
1863 disestablishments in New York (state)